"Big Time" is a song by Italian Eurodance project Whigfield, which was performed by Danish-born singer Sannie Charlotte Carlson. It was written by Annerley Gordon, Alfredo Larry Pignagnoli, Davide Riva and Paul Sears, and produced by Pignagnoli and Riva. The song was released in July 1995, by X-Energy Records as the fifth single from her debut album, Whigfield (1995). It peaked at number 21 in the UK, giving her another big hit in that country. For the British market the song was released as a double A-side single together with "Last Christmas", a cover of the English duo Wham!. In other countries, "Big Time" peaked within the top 10 in Canada and was a top 20 hit in Denmark, Italy, the Netherlands and Spain.

Critical reception
A reviewer from The Guardian described the song as "cute". Pan-European magazine Music & Media compared it to Swedish band Ace of Base, writing, "When the cat's away—that's Ace of Base—the mice will play. And they're having a big time with a pop reggae song ready for summer chart domination." Music Week commented, "Hedging her bets, Whiggy releases a drippy cut from her debut album, alongside a corny version of the Wham! festive fave."

Chart performance
"Big Time" went on becoming a moderate hit in Europe, entering the top 20 in Denmark (12), Italy (11), the Netherlands (20) and Spain (13). Additionally, it was a top 30 hit in Flemish Belgium (29), Ireland (24), Scotland (21) and the UK. In the latter, the song was released as a double single with Whigfield's cover of "Last Christmas" by Wham!. It peaked at number 21 on the UK Singles Chart on December 10, 1995, in its first week at the chart. In Germany, it reached number 50, while on the Eurochart Hot 100, it reached number 54. Outside Europe, the single was a top 10 hit in Canada, peaking at number eight on The Record singles chart, while reaching the top 30 on the RPM Dance/Urban chart, peaking at number 22.

Music video
In the accompanying music video for "Big Time", Whigfield walks in a deserted countryside with a shopping cart with foods. She wears a red dress. A white cabriolet with three girls are passing by and Whigfield goes with them. Other scenes show Whigfield singing while standing on a wrecking ball. She and the girls also stops at a car repair shop to get the car fixed. Then they drive on. At the end the shopping cart is being emptied from a rock crush. The video was later published on YouTube in March 2013.

Releases

 CD maxi, Mexico (Musart)
"Big Time" (Version Album) – 3:21
"Big Time" (Summer Zone Remix) – 5:18)
"Big Time" (MBRG Remix) – 4:50
"Big Time" (Dancing Divaz Club Mix) – 6:54
"Big Time" (Extended Version) – 4:32

 CD maxi, Italy (X-Energy Records)
"Big Time" (Album Version) – 3:21
"Big Time" (Summer Zone Remix) – 5:18
"Big Time" (Dancing Divaz Club Mix) – 6:54
"Big Time" (M.B.R.G. Remix) – 4:50
"Saturday Night" (US Classical Vocal Remix) – 9:15

 CD maxi, Canada (Quality Records)
"Big Time" (Summer Zone Remix) – 5:21
"Big Time" (Extended Version) – 4:35
"Big Time" (MBRG Remix) – 4:52
"Big Time" (Dancing Divaz Mix) – 7:01
"Big Time" (Album Version) – 3:21

 EP, Australia
"Big Time" (Single Version)
"Big Time" (Summer Zone Remix)
"Big Time" (Extended Version)
"Big Time" (MBRG Mix)
"Big Time" (Dancin Divaz Club Mix)

Charts

Weekly charts

Year-end charts

References

Whigfield songs
1995 songs
1995 singles
Songs written by Larry Pignagnoli
Songs written by Ann Lee (singer)